Harmanjeet Singh (born 1991) is a poet and lyricist. He won the Yuva Puraskar for his book Rani Tatt. Rani Tatt is a work of poems and prose on Punjab and looks at aspects through the prism of nature. He also wrote the song "Laung Laachi" for the movie Laung Laachi, and for many other Punjabi films. His lyrics have been sung also by artists like Sunidhi Chauhan, Neha Bhasin, Amrinder Gill, and Manpreet Singh. Harmanjeet is also known for writing the lyrics to the spiritual song sung by Diljit Dosanjh, "Aar Nanak Paar Nanak". Harmanjeet Singh worked with Diljit Dosanjh again for a track named "Nanak Aadh Jugaadh Jiyo". He also released a series of Dharmik tracks named "Sooraj Eko Rut Anek" with Manpreet Singh.

Personal life 
Born in Khiala Kalan village in Mansa district, in Punjab, Harmanjeet began writing poetry at a very young age. Born in 1991, he finished the tenth grade from Baba Jogi Peer Public Senior Secondary School and then graduated from a nearby college. He also works as a primary school teacher in a government school. His father was a veteran. His elder sister and mother stay at home.

Lyricist in films

References 

Punjabi-language poets
Poets from Punjab, India
Living people
1991 births
People from Mansa district, India